The 1964 United Kingdom general election was held on Thursday 15 October 1964, five years after the previous election, and thirteen years after the Conservative Party, first led by Winston Churchill, had regained power. It resulted in the Conservatives, led by the incumbent Prime Minister Alec Douglas-Home, narrowly losing to the Labour Party, led by Harold Wilson; Labour secured a parliamentary majority of four seats and ended its thirteen years in opposition. Wilson became (at the time) the youngest Prime Minister since Lord Rosebery in 1894. To date, this is also the most narrow majority obtained in the House of Commons with just 1 seat clearing Labour for a majority government.

Background 
Both major parties had changed leadership in 1963. Following the sudden death of Hugh Gaitskell early in the year, Labour had chosen Harold Wilson (at the time, thought of as being on the party's centre-left), while Alec Douglas-Home (at the time the Earl of Home) had taken over as Conservative leader and Prime Minister in the autumn after Harold Macmillan announced his resignation. Douglas-Home shortly afterward disclaimed his peerage under the Peerage Act 1963 in order to lead the party from the Commons.

Macmillan had led the Conservative government since January 1957. Despite initial popularity and a resounding election victory in 1959, he had become increasingly unpopular in the early 1960s, due to rising unemployment and inflation during the recession of 1960–1961 and the United States' cancellation of the Skybolt program intended to provide Britain with an independent nuclear weapons delivery system after the cancellation of the Blue Streak project. Although Macmillan ended the latter crisis with the Nassau Agreement guaranteeing US assistance in the Polaris programme of submarine-launched ballistic missiles, this also indirectly harmed his reputation after French President Charles de Gaulle vetoed Britain's accession bid to the European Communities over his skepticism at the Anglo-American "Special Relationship." 

However, the Labour Party was temporarily divided due to the death of Gaitskell in 1963 and the subsequent leadership election. Although Wilson won this election against his opponents George Brown and James Callaghan, he was distrusted within the party because of his previous unsuccessful leadership challenge to Gaitskell in 1960. The party also suffered from internal policy disputes over unilateral nuclear disarmament and Clause IV of its constitution committing it to nationalization of industry.

It was for a while thought likely that the Conservatives would win the scheduled 1964 general election, albeit with a reduced majority, but the emergence of the Profumo affair in March 1963 and Macmillan's handling of the matter all but destroyed the credibility of his government. While he survived a vote of no confidence in June 1963, polling indicated that the Conservatives would lose the next election heavily if Macmillan remained in power, which, along with health issues, caused Macmillan to announce his resignation in the autumn of 1963.

Douglas-Home faced a difficult task in rebuilding the party's popularity with just a year elapsing between taking office and having to face a general election. Wilson had begun to try to tie the Labour Party to the growing confidence of Britain in the 1960s, asserting that the "white heat of revolution" would sweep away "restrictive practices ... on both sides of industry". The Liberal Party enjoyed a resurgence after a virtual wipeout in the 1950s, and doubled its share of the vote, primarily at the expense of the Conservatives. Although Labour did not increase its vote share significantly, the fall in support for the Conservatives led to Wilson securing an overall majority of four seats. This proved to be unworkable, and Wilson called a snap election in 1966.

Campaign 
The pre-election campaign was prolonged, as Douglas-Home delayed calling a general election to give himself as much time as possible to improve the prospects of his party. The Labour Party indicated that it held high popular support by winning the 1964 London local elections. This led to speculation that the Conservative government would not call an election in 1964 despite constitutional precedent requiring it do so quinquennially in peacetime. However, Conservative leaders became more optimistic about their chances after winning three by-elections in Winchester, Bury St. Edmunds, and Devizes. The election campaign formally began on 25 September 1964 when Douglas-Home saw the Queen and asked for a dissolution of Parliament. The dissolution notably occurred without a formal royal prorogation and recall for the first time since 1922. 

The campaign was dominated by some of the more voluble characters of the political scene at the time. While George Brown, deputy leader of the Labour Party, toured the country making energetic speeches (and the occasional gaffe), Quintin Hogg was a leading spokesman for the Conservatives. The image of Hogg lashing out at a Wilson poster with his walking stick was one of the most striking of the campaign.

The Labour Party campaigned on what historian Andrew Thorpe called "the basis of revisionism given a significant twist in the direction of Wilsonian planning, and a more dirigiste approach to industrial modernization."  Party leaders also decided that they had lost the previous election because of their failure to come to terms with their failure to appeal to the middle class after its growth from the post–World War II economic expansion, and adjusted strategy accordingly. 

Labour called for greater co-ordination between state-run enterprises and repeated its past pledges for the renationalisation of the steel and road haulage industries privatised by past Conservative governments. However, it declared that it would not nationalise any further industries. It also promised expansions of social services, tax reform, and what would become the prices and incomes policy. In education it sought comprehensivisation of secondary education and a higher school-leaving age, while in immigration it sought both immigration quotas restricting future entry and equal rights for immigrants who had already arrived in the country. In foreign policy it pledged a re-evaluation of previous governments' foreign aid and alliances, increased British assertiveness at the United Nations, a build-up of the conventional components of the British Armed Forces, but did not promise unilateral nuclear disarmament and the dismantlement of the British nuclear arsenal as some left-wing members of the party desired. While early campaigning suggested that a Labour government would abandon the Polaris programme, Wilson quickly decided to avoid this topic altogether due to the continuing popularity of an independent British nuclear deterrent. Labour's platform of a "socialist foreign policy" also criticised the Conservative government for a scandal involving the British defence contractor Ferranti, the Aden Emergency, Cypriot intercommunal violence, escalating American involvement in the Vietnam War, arms sales to the apartheid regime of South Africa, and a contract to construct naval frigates for Francoist Spain. 

The Conservative Party suffered in the election because of Douglas-Home's unpopularity caused by his aristocratic background, his accession to the premiership without a formal election, his economic and trade policies, and the side-lining of popular Conservative leaders such as Enoch Powell and Iain Macleod. Even many Conservatives condemned him for the Resale Prices Act 1964 abolishing resale price maintenance. Douglas-Home's predecessor Macmillan described him to Queen Elizabeth II as "steel painted as wood." However, his campaigning did allow the Conservative Party's lag in the polls to narrow. The Conservative manifesto Prosperity with a Purpose pledged closer relations with the Atlantic world and the Commonwealth of Nations, development of nuclear power, industrial retraining, increased capital investment in British industry, and continued development of BAC TSR-2 supersonic fighter-bomber project. The Conservative campaign emphasised the party's diplomatic successes such as the Nassau Agreement, the Partial Nuclear Test Ban Treaty, and the defence of Malaysia in the Borneo Confrontation. Although the Conservatives made limited appeals to new Caribbean, African, and South Asian immigrants by printing campaign literature in Hindi and Urdu, it defended the Commonwealth Immigrants Act 1962 restricting immigration of Commonwealth citizens.

As in previous elections since its decline, the Liberal Party under Jo Grimond's leadership positioned itself as a non-socialist, individualist alternative to Labour. The two key domestic policy pledges in its manifesto Think for Yourself, Vote Liberal were reforms to improve the British healthcare system and devolution for Scotland and Wales. The Liberals also were distinguished by their internationalist foreign policy, becoming the first major party to endorse explicitly British membership in the European Economic Union. Supporters and leaders of the Liberal Party hoped for a breakthrough in 1964 which would re-establish it as a powerful force in British politics after its dramatic recovery from near-extinction in the 1950s and a surprise victory in the 1962 Orpington by-election, the party's first win outside the "Celtic fringe" of South West England, Wales, and Scotland in over a decade. However, by 1964 the Liberals lost much of their momentum by losing a series of by-elections and local elections, and faced growing financial difficulties.

Many party speakers, especially at televised rallies, had to deal with hecklers; in particular Douglas-Home was treated very roughly at a meeting in Birmingham. Douglas-Home's speeches dealt with the future of the nuclear deterrent, while fears of Britain's relative decline in the world, reflected in chronic balance of payment problems, helped the Labour Party's case.

By 1964, television had developed as a medium and played a much greater role than in previous British elections. It received more coverage from current affairs programs such as BBC1's Panorama, Associated-Rediffusion's This Week, and Granada Television's World in Action as well as political satire inspired by the success of That Was the Week That Was. The election night was broadcast live by BBC Television, and was presented for the fifth and final time by Richard Dimbleby, with Robin Day, Ian Trethowan, Cliff Michelmore and David Butler.

Opinion polling 

 NOP: Lab swing 3.5% (Lab majority of 12)
 Gallup: Lab swing 4% (Lab majority of 23)
 Research Services: Lab swing 2.75% (Con majority of 30)
 Daily Express: Lab swing of 1.75% (Con majority of 60)

Results 
The Conservatives made a surprising recovery from being well behind Labour when Home become prime minister, and would have won if 900 voters in eight seats had changed votes. Labour won a very slim majority of four seats, forming a government for the first time since 1951. Labour achieved a swing of just over 3%, although its vote rose by only 0.3% and achieved a lesser number of votes than in its previous defeats of 1955 and 1959. The main shift was the swing from the Conservatives to the Liberals of 5.7%. The Liberals defied popular expectations of a net loss and won nearly twice as many votes as in 1959, partly because they had 150 more candidates. Although this was the Liberals' best electoral performance since the 1929 general election and left it in a key parliamentary position due to Labour's slender majority, it failed to achieve the desired breakthrough returning the party to its pre-World War II status. Wilson became Prime Minister, replacing Douglas-Home. The four-seat majority was not sustainable for a full Parliament, and Wilson called another general election in 1966. In particular the small majority meant the government could not implement its policy of nationalising the steel industry, due to the opposition of two of its backbenchers, Woodrow Wyatt and Desmond Donnelly.

89 female candidates stood in the election with 29 women being elected as MPs (11 for the Conservatives and 18 for Labour).

This was the only election in Britain's recent history when all seats were won by the three main parties: no minor parties, independents or splinter groups won any seats. It is also the only time both Labour and the Conservatives have taken over 300 seats each and was the last election in which one party, namely the Conservative Party, contested every single seat. The Conservatives had previously held off on contesting certain Liberal-held seats as per local-level agreements to avoid vote-splitting, but ended that policy at this election. The resultant splitting of votes actually helped grant Labour a majority, by throwing two formerly Liberal-held seats in northern England to Labour; however, the outcome of the election would not have been meaningfully altered had the Liberals retained the seats, as Labour would still have had as many seats as the other two parties combined, and Liberal leader Jo Grimond was not inclined to prop up a minority Conservative government.

Home told D. R. Thorpe that the most important reason for the Conservative loss was Iain Macleod's "The Tory Leadership" article, in which the former cabinet minister claimed that an Etonian "magic circle" conspiracy had led to Home becoming prime minister. British Ambassador to the United States David Ormsby-Gore wrote to Home that "Almost anything could have tipped the balance. Khrushchev’s removal from office twelve hours earlier, China’s nuclear explosion thirty-six hours earlier or just Rab [Butler] keeping his mouth shut for once." David Butler and Donald E. Stokes's influential 1969 British Election Study report Political Change in Britain attributed the Labour victory to Wilson's greater popularity than Home and the party's appeal to younger voters. After British elections in the 1980s and the 1990s challenged many of the assumptions of Butler and Stokes's model, the BES issued a second 2001 report by political scientists from the University of Texas and the University of Essex emphasizing the role of valence politics over public perception of party performance. 

Working-class voters also selected Labour in greater numbers than in the previous election due in part to the weakening of the postwar boom which had popularized the Conservatives in the 1950s, although the Conservatives attracted a greater number of female voters than before. The Conservatives tried attract working-class voters by improving the party's relationships with trade union movement in the 1960s through the Conservative Trade Union Councils at the party level and the new National Economic Development Council at the governmental level. However, their outreach had been weakened by the Rookes v Barnard decision allowing employers to collect punitive damages from strike actions and Home's tough approach to industrial relations. As a result, the trade unions heavily supported Labour in the election and encouraged working-class support of the party. As much as 85 percent of Labour's election spending consisted of funds raised by trade unions. Aggregate data analyses of the results demonstrate higher turnout in constituencies dominated by the professional–managerial class, agricultural workers, council tenants, voters without automobiles, and the elderly.  On the other hand, Labour's poorer performance in central and southern England and loss of five seats in that area indicated an increasing white working-class backlash against nonwhite immigration. The most notable example was the Smethwick contest where the racist Conservative candidate Peter Griffiths unseated Shadow Foreign Secretary Patrick Gordon Walker.

|-
|+ style="caption-side: bottom; font-weight:normal" |All parties shown.
|}

Votes summary

Seats summary

Transfers of seats 

 All comparisons are with the 1959 election.
In some cases the change is due to the MP defecting to the gaining party. Such circumstances are marked with a *.
In other circumstances the change is due to the seat having been won by the gaining party in a by-election in the intervening years, and then retained in 1964. Such circumstances are marked with a †.

3 Seat gained by Labour in a by-election but regained by the Conservatives in 1964.
4 Seat gained by Conservatives in a 1961 by-election but regained by Labour in another 1963 by-election.

Incumbents defeated

Televised results programmes 
Both BBC Television and ITV provided live televised coverage of the results and provided commentary.

See also 
List of MPs elected in the 1964 United Kingdom general election
Smethwick in the 1964 general election
1964 United Kingdom general election in Northern Ireland

Notes

References

Further reading

Manifestos
, 1964 Conservative Party manifesto
, 1964 Labour Party manifesto
, 1964 Liberal Party manifesto

 
1964
General election
United Kingdom general election
Alec Douglas-Home
Harold Wilson